Litylenchus crenatae mccannii is a newly recognized nematode subspecies believed to be the cause of beech leaf disease.

References

Nematodes
Nematoida